Norwood Hospital is a hospital in Norwood, Massachusetts founded as Willett Cottage Hospital in 1902.  It is a member of Steward Health Care.

In late June of 2020, a bad storm hit the town.  Most of South Norwood was flooded with more than 5 inches of rain pouring down in less than a few hours. The hospital, located in South Norwood, lost all power and had to evacuate 80-90 people at 10:00pm.  The people were brought to other hospitals, and the hospital sat with its power out.  In September of that year, The Weather Channel showed footage from the hospital, of water at the door, bursting in, and going through the hallway.  After the incident, Steward Health Care System announced that the hospital would be rebuilt as a “state of the art” hospital, that would open late 2023.  As of November, 2022, the hospital has been fully demolished and construction should be started soon.

External links
Norwood Hospital
https://www.norwood-hospital.org/about-us/awards-recognitions

Hospital buildings completed in 1902
Hospitals in Norfolk County, Massachusetts